Degland is a French surname. Notable people with the surname include:

Côme-Damien Degland (1787–1856), French physician and zoologist
Emmanuel Degland (1900–1969), French javelin thrower

French-language surnames